The Saaroa or Hla'alua people are an indigenous people of central southern Taiwan. They live in the two villages of Taoyuan and Kaochung in Taoyuan District, Kaohsiung and Maya Village in Namasia District, Kaohsiung.

The group attained official recognition from the Taiwanese government on 26 June 2014 under the name Hla'alua as the 15th indigenous people of Taiwan. Previously, the group as considered as subgroup of the Tsou people.

See also
 Saaroa language
 Taiwanese indigenous peoples

References

Taiwanese indigenous peoples